Trechus dzykhvensis is a species of ground beetle in the subfamily Trechinae. It was described by Belousov in 1990.

References

dzykhvensis
Beetles described in 1990